Helga Richter is a retired German rower who won seven medals at European championships between 1956 and 1964, five of them with Hannelore Göttlich. After 1959–1960 she competed as Helga Menzel-Richter or Helga Menzel and after 1960–1961 as Helga Kolbe-Richter or Helga Kolbe. In December 1964, she was awarded the Medal of Merit of the GDR.

References

Year of birth missing (living people)
Living people
East German female rowers
Recipients of the Medal of Merit of the GDR
European Rowing Championships medalists